Gumyeong Station is a station on the Busan Metro Line 2 in Gupo-dong, Buk District, Busan, South Korea.

External links

  Cyber station information from Busan Transportation Corporation

Busan Metro stations
Buk District, Busan
Railway stations in South Korea opened in 1999